Gonobilovo is a rural locality (a village) in Moshokskoye Rural Settlement, Sudogodsky District, Vladimir Oblast, Russia. The population was 250 as of 2010. There are 2 streets.

Geography 
Gonobilovo is located on the Kostyanka River, 40 km southeast of Sudogda (the district's administrative centre) by road. Shustovo is the nearest rural locality.

References 

Rural localities in Sudogodsky District